Wakaf Mempelam is a small village and a ward of Kuala Terengganu, Terengganu, Malaysia.

Kuala Terengganu
Villages in Terengganu